Križna Gora is a small settlement above Visoko in the Municipality of Škofja Loka in the Upper Carniola region of Slovenia.

Mass graves
Križna Gora is the site of a mass grave and an unmarked grave from the Second World War. It contains the remains of a family of four from Kranj that was murdered by the Partisans during the war. The Križna Gora Grave lies on a steep slope west of the house at Križna Gora no. 22. It contains the remains of a local female civilian that was shot by Partisan political activist.

Church
The local church on a hill above the settlement is dedicated to the Holy Cross and was built around 1500. It contains many well-preserved frescos from 1502 that depict the legends of Saint Ulrich, to whom the church was dedicated until 1867, and of Saint Corbinian. Some of the frescos in the nave, dating to around 1530, are believed to be by Jernej of Loka. The hill with the church is a popular destination for short outings by locals.

References

External links

Križna Gora at Geopedia

Populated places in the Municipality of Škofja Loka